Susumu Hanagata (花形進 Hanagata Susumu, born January 21, 1947) is a Japanese former professional boxer in the flyweight division. Hanagata won the WBA flyweight championship in 1974 when he defeated Thai champion Chartchai Chionoi via a sixth-round technical knockout.

See also
List of light-flyweight boxing champions
List of Japanese boxing world champions
Boxing in Japan

References

External links

1947 births
Living people
Flyweight boxers
World flyweight boxing champions
World Boxing Association champions
Japanese male boxers
Sportspeople from Yokohama
Presidents of the Japan Pro Boxing Association